Sports in Pittsburgh have been played dating back to the American Civil War. Baseball, hockey, and the first professional American football game had been played in the city by 1892. Pittsburgh was first known as the "City of Champions" when the Pittsburgh Pirates, Pittsburgh Panthers football team, and Pittsburgh Steelers won multiple championships in the 1970s. Today, the city has three major professional sports franchises, the Pirates, Steelers, and Penguins; while the University of Pittsburgh Panthers compete in a Division I Power Five conference, the highest level of collegiate athletics in the United States, in both football and basketball. Local universities Duquesne and Robert Morris also field Division I teams in men's and women's basketball and Division I FCS teams in football. Robert Morris also fields Division I men's and women's ice hockey teams.

Pittsburgh's major teams have seen great success, with the MLB's Pirates winning 5 World Series titles, the NHL's Penguins winning 5 Stanley Cups, and the NFL's Steelers winning a tied league record 6 Super Bowls. The Pittsburgh Panthers have also been successful in the NCAA with 9 national championships in football and 2 in basketball.

The flag of Pittsburgh is colored with black and gold, based on the colors of William Pitt's coat of arms; Pittsburgh is the only city in the United States in which all professional sporting teams share the same colors. The city's first National Hockey League (NHL) franchise, the Pittsburgh Pirates, and that team's non-NHL predecessor, the Pittsburgh Yellow Jackets, wore black and gold as their colors in the 1920s. The colors were adopted by founder of the Pittsburgh Steelers, Art Rooney, in 1933. In 1948, the Pittsburgh baseball Pirates switched their colors from red and blue to black and gold. Pittsburgh's second NHL franchise, the Pittsburgh Penguins, wore blue and white, due to then-general manager Jack Riley's upbringing in Ontario. In 1979, after the Steelers and Pirates had each won their respective league championships, the Penguins altered their color scheme to match, despite objections from the Boston Bruins, who have used the black and gold combination since the 1935-36 NHL season.

In 1975, late Steelers radio broadcaster Myron Cope invented the Terrible Towel, which has become "arguably the best-known fan symbol of any major pro sports team." Cope was one of multiple sports figures born in Pittsburgh and its surrounding area; others include golfer Arnold Palmer, Olympian Kurt Angle, and basketball player Jack Twyman.  Pittsburgh is also sometimes called the "Cradle of Quarterbacks" due to the number of prominent players of that position who hail from the area, including NFL greats Jim Kelly, George Blanda, Johnny Unitas, Joe Namath, Dan Marino, and Joe Montana.

Professional team sports
The City of Pittsburgh has had various professional sports franchises throughout its history and today is home to three teams competing at the highest professional level in their respective sports: the Pittsburgh Steelers of the NFL, the Pittsburgh Penguins of the NHL, and the Pittsburgh Pirates of Major League Baseball.

Major League Professional Teams

Minor League Professional Teams

Top Tier Amateur Teams

Baseball

Prior to 1876, three amateur Pittsburgh baseball teams—the Enterprise, the Xanthas, and the Olympics—competed, most often at Recreation Park. On April 15, 1876, Recreation Park was the site of a game between the Xanthas and the Pittsburgh Alleghenies (alternately spelled "Alleghenys"), an unrelated forerunner to the "Alleghenys" team which would later be renamed the Pirates.  The Alleghenies won the game 7–3. The 1877 squad was the most successful yet, finishing within 1 game of the pennant in the International Association; only a Canadian team had a better record, allowing the city potential bragging rights for being the best American team that season.

1882 marked the first "major league" and fully professional season for the Pittsburgh Alleghenies (Pirates) and in 1887, the Alleghenies moved from American Association to the National League after owner William Nimick became frustrated over a contract dispute. The Pirates were purchased in 1900 by Barney Dreyfuss, who would go down in history as the "Father of the modern World Series" and its precursor, the Chronicle-Telegraph Cup, both of which saw the Pirates participate in the inaugural series. He recruited Hall of Famers Fred Clarke and Pittsburgh native Honus Wagner and built the first concrete and steel (first "modern") baseball stadium, Forbes Field. Under Dreyfuss, the Pirates won pre-World Series world titles in 1901 and 1902, National League pennants from 1901–1903, 1909, 1925 and 1927 and World Series in 1909 and 1925.  The 1902 squad set major league records for winning percentage and even today is the second most winning team ever fielded in the sport. The franchise won the World Series three more times— in 1960, 1971, and 1979.  In 1960, the team became the first to win a World Series on a walk-off home run, hit by Bill Mazeroski, and they remain the only team to win on a walk-off homer in the decisive seventh game.  In 1979, the Pirates repeated the accomplishment of their own 1925 World Series team, coming back from a three-games-to-one deficit, winning three games in a row when facing elimination, for the title.  Thus the Pirates became (and they currently remain) the only franchise in the history of all sports to win world titles more than once when coming back from a 3-1 deficit.  The 1979 Pirates also are unique in that they are the only team in all sports to have players who captured all four MVP awards:  Seasonal (Willie Stargell, co-MVP with Keith Hernandez), All Star Game (Dave Parker), NLCS (Willie Stargell), and World Series (Willie Stargell) within a single season.  Since 1970 the team has won their division and qualified for the playoffs nine times:  six in the 1970s, and three times in a row from 1990 to 1992.  Pirate players have won the league MVP award in 1960 (Dick Groat), 1966 (Roberto Clemente), 1978 (Dave Parker), 1979 (Willie Stargell), 1990 (Barry Bonds), 1992 (Barry Bonds), and 2013 (Andrew McCutchen) and the Cy Young Award in 1960 (Vernon Law) and 1990 (Doug Drabek).  In 2001, the team opened PNC Park on the city's North Shore, regularly ranked as one of the top three baseball parks in the country.

In addition to the Pirates, the Pittsburgh Stogies, Pittsburgh Burghers and Pittsburgh Rebels played in various leagues from 1884 to 1915.  The Rebels won the pennant in 1912 and finished just a half game shy of a pennant in 1915. The Pittsburgh Keystones, Homestead Grays (playing in the city limits), and Pittsburgh Crawfords played in the Negro leagues. With players including Josh Gibson and Cumberland Posey the Grays won 12 league titles—the most by any Negro league team—including nine consecutive from 1937 to 1945. The Crawfords finished their eight-year existence with a .633 winning percentage, with a line-up including Gibson, Cool Papa Bell, and Satchel Paige and claimed four straight league titles from 1933 until 1936, with the 1935 team judged by some as the greatest one to ever take the field in the Negro leagues, or perhaps in baseball period.  Just as they initially played in the first "modern" ballpark in the majors (Forbes Field), Crawfords owner Gus Greenlee constructed the first steel and concrete "modern" stadium in the Negro leagues, with Greenlee Field opening in the Hill District on April 29, 1932.

Basketball
Pittsburgh South Side won Western Pennsylvania Basketball League and Central Basketball League titles in 1904, 1907 and 1913, coming in second place in 1908, 1911 and 1915.  The "Black Fives" league enjoyed success in the city with Monticello-Loendi winning national championships in 1912, and four in a row from 1920–23. The Pittsburgh Pirates from 1937–39 and Pittsburgh Raiders in 1944–45 continued professional basketball in the city in the National Basketball League. Pittsburgh had one of the founding members of what became the NBA, the Pittsburgh Ironmen however only played a single season 1947–48 before folding.  The Pittsburgh Renaissance (or Rens) played from 1961 until 1963 in the ABL, posting the city's best record in almost 40 years when they finished 2nd in 1962.

The most lasting legacy of pro roundball in Pittsburgh was the Pittsburgh Pipers-Pittsburgh Condors of the American Basketball Association from 1967 until 1972.  In the first ABA World Championship in 1968, the Pipers defeated the New Orleans Buccaneers, which were owned by Harry Connick Sr.

After the ABA Pipers/Condors folded in 1972 the city hosted the Pittsburgh Piranhas of the CBA in the mid-1990s.  The franchise made it to the championship round in the 1994–95 season only to come away second best.  In the late 2000s the Pittsburgh Xplosion, a development league team owned by former NBA player Freddie Lewis, played in a revamped ABA/CBA at Mellon Arena and the Petersen Events Center before ceasing operations prior to the 2008–09 season because of the economic recession. Another professional basketball team, the Pittsburgh Phantoms of the American Basketball Association, played during the 2009–10 season and held their games at the Carnegie Library of Homestead, but folded prior to the following season.

Hockey

First played in Pittsburgh in 1895, ice hockey grew in popularity after the Duquesne Gardens opened in 1899. In 1901 the Western Pennsylvania Hockey League (WPHL), a semi-professional ice hockey league based in Pittsburgh in the early 1900s, may have been involved in the first trade involving professional hockey players. In 1907, the WPHL was the first league to openly hire hockey players. The league played its games in three Pittsburgh hockey arenas, the Gardens, the Schenley Park Casino and the Winter Garden at Exposition Hall. The Casino, which was destroyed by a fire in 1896, had the first artificial ice surface in North America, was the first place in Pittsburgh where organized ice hockey was played and had the most modern indoor lighting system of the time era, that consisted of 1,500 incandescent lamps, 11 arc lights and 4 white calcium lights. In 1905–1907, the city was represented in the International Professional Hockey League, the first fully professional hockey league, by the Pittsburgh Professionals.

The Gardens housed the largest indoor rink in the world and was home to the city's first NHL franchise, the Pittsburgh Pirates, from 1925 to 1930. The Gardens also was home to the Pittsburgh Shamrocks and the Pittsburgh Yellow Jackets of the International Hockey League as well as the Pittsburgh Hornets of the American Hockey League.

In 1961, Pittsburgh Civic Arena was constructed for use of the Pittsburgh Civic Light Opera. Founded, by Jack McGregor and Peter Block as part of the 1967 NHL expansion, the Pittsburgh Penguins have played home games in downtown Pittsburgh since their inception—first at the Civic Arena, and since 2010 at PPG Paints Arena. The Penguins won back-to-back Stanley Cup championships in 1991 and 1992. The franchise recorded their third Stanley Cup in 2009. The teams included players Mark Recchi, Kevin Stevens, Jaromír Jágr, and Mario Lemieux. Lemieux holds multiple franchise records and was elected to the Hockey Hall of Fame in 1997. He suffered from multiple injuries, including Hodgkin's lymphoma, throughout his career. In 1999, Lemieux purchased the Penguins and saved the franchise from bankruptcy. He returned to play one year later as the first player/owner of the modern era. The Penguins, led by top point scorers Evgeni Malkin and Sidney Crosby, returned to the Stanley Cup finals in 2008 and won the franchise's third Cup in 2009. The franchise recorded their fourth Stanley Cup in 2016 and their fifth Stanley Cup in 2017.

Football
On November 12, 1892, Pudge Heffelfinger was paid $500 to participate in an American football game for the Allegheny Athletic Association. With this transaction, Heffelfinger became the first person to be paid to play football. The first professional football game was held at Recreation Park in Pittsburgh. Heffelfinger scored the game's only points as the Allegheny Athletic Association defeated the Pittsburgh Athletic Club, 4–0. The early professional football era was also represented in Pittsburgh, by top athletic association teams in the Western Pennsylvania Professional Football Circuit. The Duquesne Country and Athletic Club, was the top pro team in the state in 1898 and 1899. The first ever pro football all-star game was played at Exposition Park between the Duquesne Country and Athletic Club and a collection of players from several teams in the area on December 3, 1898.  Duquesne won the game 16–0.  Later the Homestead Library & Athletic Club, fielded the top pro team in the state in 1900 and 1901. In 1902 the top players in the area, mainly from the Duquesne Country and Athletic Club line-up, formed the Pittsburgh Stars of the first National Football League. The Stars were suspected of being financed by Barney Dreyfuss and William Chase Temple, the owners of baseball's Pittsburgh Pirates. The team featured baseball players in the line-up including Christy Mathewson, a future Hall of Fame pitcher with the New York Giants and Fred Crolius, and outfielder with Pirates. The team won the league's only championship in 1902.

In 1933, as the oldest of nine children Art Rooney, who had been raised on the North Side of Pittsburgh, founded the Pittsburgh Steelers. Originally nicknamed the Pirates, the team later changed their name to the Steelers, to represent the city's heritage of producing steel. The Steelers' first season with a winning record came in 1942. However, they lost their first playoff game in 1947. In 1969, the Steelers hired head coach Chuck Noll who strategically drafted players in order to improve the team. Three years later, in the first playoff game at Three Rivers Stadium Pittsburgh's rookie running back Franco Harris returned an errant pass that bounced off an opposing player for a game-winning touchdown in a play that later became labeled the Immaculate Reception. In 1974, the Steelers won their first Super Bowl in franchise history—a feat which they would repeat in 1975, 1978, and 1979 to become the first NFL franchise to win four Super Bowls. In 1992, Noll was succeeded by Bill Cowher, who led the franchise to its fifth Super Bowl victory in 2005. Mike Tomlin succeeded Cower and led the Steelers to an NFL record sixth Super Bowl victory in 2008. As of 2009, the Steelers have 18 members in the Pro Football Hall of Fame. In October 1964, Ernie Stautner, who played on the Steelers from 1950 to 1963, became the only Steelers' player to have his number—70—retired. Charles "Mean Joe" Greene had his number -75- retired in 2014.  In 2008, ESPN.com ranked Steelers' fans as the best in the NFL, citing their "unbelievable" sellout streak of 299 consecutive games. Steelers Chairman Dan Rooney, son of founder Art Rooney, became the majority owner of the Steelers in November 2008 along with his son Art II, after they bought all of the shares of two of his four brothers.

Outside of the NFL, the city was represented by the Pittsburgh Americans of the second American Football League in 1936 and 1937. It was also briefly represented by the Pittsburgh Maulers of the United States Football League, in 1984, and the Pittsburgh Gladiators (now the Tampa Bay Storm), of the Arena Football League from 1987 until 1990. A second Arena Football League team, the Pittsburgh Power, played in the Consol Energy Center from 2011 until 2014.

In addition, Pittsburgh has also been home to women's full-contact football teams. The Pittsburgh Passion were founded in 2002 as members of the National Women's Football Association, then played in the Independent Women's Football League, and then Women's Football Alliance. The Passion play their home games at West Allegheny High School in nearby Imperial. The team went 12–0 and won a national title in 2007 as members of the NWFA. The Pittsburgh Rebellion were members of the Legends Football League during the 2017 season with home games at the downtown Highmark Stadium.

The "most established area minor-league football team" the Pittsburgh Colts are members of the North American Football League's Regional American Football League.

The United States Football League (2022) announced that the league would be relaunching in April 2022 and that the Pittsburgh Maulers would be returning

Soccer
Pittsburgh Riverhounds SC are members of the USLC (second division) and play in Highmark Stadium.

The amateur club Pittsburgh Beadling have contested for regional and national titles for over 100 years, winning the National Amateur Cup in 1954, and historic teams such as the suburban Harmarville Hurricanes won national titles in 1952 and 1956 and contested for it in 1953.  Pittsburgh Gallatin, Pittsburgh-Heidelberg and Pittsburgh Morgan Strasser all winning national titles in the 1920s, the 1930s, the 1940s and the 1950s.

Aldo Donelli, better known as a Duquesne University Football player and coach played soccer with a number of clubs in the 1920s and 1930s and was a member of the United States men's national soccer team during the 1934 FIFA World Cup. He is a member of the National Soccer Hall of Fame. In a 4–2 qualifying victory over Mexico in Rome, Italy on May 24, he tallied all four times, becoming the first American to score his first three international goals with the senior team in the same match.

The region's interest in soccer continues as modern stars such as natives Justin Evans, Meghan Klingenberg, Don Malinowski, John Stollmeyer, A. J. Wood and Marvell Wynne II have all achieved international success.

Rugby
The Pittsburgh Forge Rugby Club are rugby union team based in South Side Pittsburgh. The club formed in 2018 when the Pittsburgh City RC and the Pittsburgh Highlanders combined to form the Forge. The Pittsburgh Forge currently fields two competitive men's senior sides and one competitive women's side. The men currently participate in the Midwest Competition Region (NCR1) at the Division II and Division III levels, and the women also play in the Midwest Competition Region at the Division II level.

The Pittsburgh Sledgehammers are a rugby league team based in Cheswick, Pennsylvania (outside of Pittsburgh) which was formed in 2010 and plays in the AMNRL competition.

The Pittsburgh Harlequins are a rugby union team also based in Cheswick. The Pittsburgh Harlequins Rugby Club was founded in 1973 by a group of University of Pittsburgh law students. The organization has an active roster of 45 players and an alumni roster inclusive of more than 70 seasons of play. The Harlequins Rugby Club is a Division I member of the Mid-Atlantic Rugby Football Union. Over 300 active players wear the Harlequin jerseys every year at the Division 1 men's, Under 19, and Under 14 levels. In 1995, the Founders Field Center for Athletic Leadership was developed to support the Harlequins Men's and Youth programs. The 12 acre Founders Field facility includes lighting, irrigation, a clubhouse, locker rooms, concessions, and parking.

Major league professional championships

Pittsburgh Steelers (NFL) 
6 Super Bowl titles

 1974 (IX)
 1975 (X)
 1978 (XIII)
 1979 (XIV)
 2005 (XL)
 2008 (XLIII)

Pittsburgh Penguins (NHL) 
5 Stanley Cup titles

 1991
 1992
 2009
 2016
 2017

Pittsburgh Pirates (MLB) 
5 World Series titles

 1909
 1925
 1960
 1971
 1979

Homestead Grays (NNL) 
3 Negro World Series titles

 1943
 1944
 1948

Pittsburgh Pipers (ABA) 
1 ABA Finals title

 1968

Individual sports and recreation

Golf
Golf has deep roots in the area with the region boasting the oldest course in continuous use in the nation: Foxburg Country Club dating from 1887. The suburban Oakmont Country Club has hosted the U.S. Open championships more than any other course in the nation (9) along with two U.S. Women's Open championships, three PGA Championships, and eight U.S. Amateurs.

Such golf legends as Arnold Palmer, Jim Furyk and Rocco Mediate learned the game and began their careers on Pittsburgh area courses. Suburban courses such as Laurel Valley Golf Club and the Pittsburgh Field Club have hosted PGA Championships (1937, 1965), the Ryder Cup (1975), LPGA Championships (1957–1958), Senior Players Championships (2012–2013) and the Senior PGA Championship (2005).

Local courses have sponsored annual major tournaments for 39 years:

 Pennsylvania Open 1920–1940 (even years)
 Dapper Dan Open 1939–1949
 Pittsburgh Open 1956
 Pittsburgh Senior Classic 1993–1998
 84 Lumber Classic 2001–2006
 Mylan Classic 2010–2013

The region has deep roots in golf, boasting the oldest continuous country club in the U.S. at Foxburg, dating back to 1887.

The suburban Oakmont Country Club has hosted the U.S. Open Championships more than any other course at nine, and thus the Pittsburgh metro area more than any other metro.  Oakmont has also hosted two U.S. Women's Open championships, three PGA Championships, and eight U.S. Amateurs. Other area courses such as Laurel Valley Golf Club and the Pittsburgh Field Club have hosted PGA Championships, the Ryder Cup, LPGA Championships and Senior PGA Championships.

The region has hosted annual PGA Tour events such as the 84 Lumber Classic (2001–2006) at Mystic Rock, the Dapper Dan Open 1939–49, the Pittsburgh Open (1950s), the Tri State Open (1980s), the Pittsburgh Senior Classic (1993–1998) and since 2010 the annual Mylan Classic.

Golf greats such as Arnold Palmer, Jim Furyk, Rocco Mediate and others hail from the region.

Fishing
Since the 1960s the city has focused on revitalizing its rivers, hosting the Bassmaster Classic and the Forrest Wood Cup in the 2000s and seeing a boom in local fishing participation.  Among the variety are Catfish and Trout.

Rowing/Rafting/Kayaking
Pittsburgh is the host city for both the annual Three Rivers Regatta (since 1977) and the annual Head of the Ohio (since 1987) races and events.  The University of Pittsburgh, Carnegie Mellon University and Duquesne University as well as several area high schools have long standing rowing teams.

In 2010 National Geographic named the city to its top six of "Best Cities for Kayaking". Kayak Pittsburgh is the largest river recreation rental in the area located on the North Shore on the Allegheny River.

Suburban Ohiopyle State Park offers some of the best white-water rafting in the country.

Trails/Camping/Biking
Pittsburgh has multiple mountain biking areas close to the city in area parks and in the surrounding suburbs. Frick Park has biking trails and Hartwood Acres Park has many miles of single track trails. A recent project, "Rails to Trails", has converted miles of former railroads to recreational trails, including a Pittsburgh-Washington, D.C. bike/walking trail. Kayaking is popular on the city's three rivers.

Pittsburgh and its region are internationally known for its extensive and varied trail system.  Such assets as the Three Rivers, Ohio River, Youghiogheny River, Beaver River, Indian Creek, Panhandle, Laurel Highlands, Rachel Carson, Five Star and Montour offer stunning, natural, suburban and urban views of the metropolitan area.  The Great Allegheny Passage provides an all natural-trail (non motorized) link to Washington, D.C., while the North Country Trail passes through the northern suburbs of the city and connects Bismarck, North Dakota to the Plattsburgh, New York area, with such cities as Duluth, Minnesota and Buffalo, New York in its path.

Within the urban core of the city and its immediate surroundings the Steps of Pittsburgh offer an urban hiking experience.  "Urban oasis" parks that bring the wilds of nature into the middle of the urban core and feature over a mile of trails within their individual boundaries include: Point State, Frick, Highland, Schenley, Riverview, Grandview, South Side, Riverfront, Three Rivers, Point of View, and Roberto Clemente.

Large 500–2,000 acre suburban parks that feature several miles of diverse trails each are plentiful throughout the metropolitan area.
Northern suburbs: North, Hartwood Acres, Harrison Hills, Deer Lakes, Moraine, McConnells Mill
Southern suburbs: South, Round Hill, Ohiopyle,
Western suburbs: Settler's Cabin, Hillman, Raccoon Creek.
Eastern suburbs: Boyce, White Oak, Renziehausen, Keystone, Laurel Mountain, Laurel Ridge, Laurel Summit, Linn Run, Forbes

For hikers/trailblazers that desire a historical or cultural element to nature the metropolitan area offers the Fort Necessity National Battlefield, Bushy Run Battlefield, the Bear Run conservancy containing both Fallingwater and Kentuck Knob, the smaller yet hikable Meadowcroft Rock Shelter features pre-Columbian archeology.  The large urban parks described earlier such as Schenley Park includes several historical/cultural sites including Phipps Conservatory and proximity to Schenley Plaza, the Cathedral of Learning, Hillman Library and the Frick Gallery. Riverview includes the Allegheny Observatory and Point includes the Fort Pitt Museum and the remains of Fort Duquesne.

For true environmentalists and wildlife fans the metro area includes the Jennings Environmental Education Center, as well the Allegheny Islands State Park, Ohio River Islands National Wildlife Refuge and Ohioplye for hiking and water sports.

Tennis
Such teams as the Pittsburgh Triangles have built a small but loyal fan base for tennis in the region, being a perennial championship contender in the 1970s and winning a world title in 1975.  Generations later the region still has deep tennis roots with the year-round all-weather Mellon Park Tennis Center being a world class facility for the sport, and helping to develop natives such as Bjorn Fratangelo, Bonnie Gadusek, Donald Johnson and Gretchen Magers in succeeding in international competition and rankings.

From 1979 to 1984 the city also hosted a yearly international tournament, the Pittsburgh Open.

Skiing/skating
Seven Springs Mountain Resort, Hidden Valley, Pennsylvania, Wisp Ski Resort and Boyce Park offer skiing with both PPG Place and North Park offering ice skating.  In 2011, the Pittsburgh Penguins created a new public rink in the South Side neighborhood's Southside Works called "Penguin Pond".

Year round ice skating and skating events can be enjoyed at indoor area rinks including the Rostraver Ice Garden, Island Sports Center, IceoPlex at Southpointe and Bladerunners Ice Complex.

Such notable olympians as natives Kristi Leskinen, Kylie Gleason, Suna Murray, Ron Robertson, Mike Seibert, Suzanne Semanick, Jamie Silverstein and Taylor Toth have trained and began their careers at area facilities.

Youth sports 
Youth football
Suburban league, Big East youth football league
Penn Trafford, Woodland Hills, Greater Latrobe, Jeannette, PHMFA, Arken, Franklin Regional, Plum, Mckeesport, Gateway

College sports
There are several universities within the city that field athletic teams in NCAA Division I including the University of Pittsburgh (often referred to as "Pitt"), Duquesne University and Robert Morris University.  Of these, Pitt is the only school that is a member of the so-called "Power Five" conferences that are primary partners in the College Football Playoff structure (the Atlantic Coast Conference).  Other universities in Pittsburgh that field athletic teams include Carnegie Mellon University (Division III), Chatham University (Division III), Point Park University (NAIA), and Carlow University (NAIA).

Football
College football in Pittsburgh dates back to the University of Pittsburgh which first organized a football team in 1889 and played its first sanctioned game in 1890. In the first half of the 20th century, Pitt, Duquesne, and Carnegie Tech (now called Carnegie Mellon) all fielded football squads that made "major" bowl game appearances from the 1920s through the 1930s. These appearances included Duquesne in the 1933 and 1936 Orange Bowl, Carnegie Tech in the 1938 Sugar Bowl, and the University of Pittsburgh appearing in four Rose Bowls (1927, 1929, 1932, 1936) as well as nearby Washington and Jefferson College in the 1922 Rose Bowl. In particular, Pitt was a national power during this era, claiming 8 national championships under the guidance of coaching legends such as Pop Warner and Jock Sutherland.  More recently, the Panthers won another National Championship in 1976 and competed for several more through the 1980s.  Multiple inductees into the College Football Hall of Fame played at Pitt, including Dan Marino, Tony Dorsett, Mike Ditka, and Larry Fitzgerald. Pitt is the only university in Western Pennsylvania to still play college football at the highest level, the Football Bowl Subdivision, while Duquesne and Robert Morris have football teams that compete in the Football Championship Subdivision, and Carnegie Mellon fields a Division III football team.

Basketball

Three Pittsburgh universities, the University of Pittsburgh, Duquesne University, and Robert Morris University, compete in NCAA Division I basketball. Pitt and Duquesne are the traditional basketball powers in the city, but all three universities have made multiple appearances in the National Invitation Tournament and NCAA tournament. Pitt claims two pre-NCAA tournament National Championships in 1928 and 1930  while Duquesne won the NIT title in 1955, its second straight trip to the NIT title game. Since the 2000–2001 season, a team from the region has always reached a post-season tournament, with Pitt having won multiple Big East Conference championships and having appeared in nine consecutive NCAA Tournaments, advancing to the Sweet 16 four times and the Elite Eight once. In the years 1941, 1964, 1980, 1981, 1982, 1989, 1992 and 2008, two of the city's universities sent teams to tournaments; in 2009 and 2010, all three universities earned bids to post season tournaments.

Pitt women's basketball has also made recent appearances in the NCAA tournament. A rivalry game between Pitt and Duquesne, termed the City Game, is played annually between the two schools' men's and women's basketball teams, as well as their baseball teams.

Other collegiate sports
Along with college football and men's and women's basketball, the area universities compete in many additional sports.  The University of Pittsburgh also fields NCAA Division I teams in baseball (its oldest sport. first played in 1869), cross country, gymnastics, track and field, soccer, softball, swimming and diving, tennis, volleyball, and wrestling. The Duquesne Dukes, in addition to many of the sports above, also participates in Division I lacrosse, golf, and rowing. Robert Morris University fields Division I teams in men's and women's hockey, among other sports.

Major Events

Annual events

Pittsburgh also hosts several annual major sporting events, including the:
 Three Rivers Regatta (Since 1977)
 Pittsburgh Vintage Grand Prix (Since 1983)
 Dirty Dozen Cycle Race (Since 1983)
 Pittsburgh Marathon (Since 1985)
 Great Race 10K (Since 1985)
 Head of the Ohio Regatta (Since 1987)
 Three Rivers Classic (Since 2012)
Great Pittsburgh Soap Box Derby
Mckeesport Pa
The city's vibrant rivers have attracted annual world title competitions of the Forrest Wood Cup in 2009 and the Bassmaster Classic in 2005.

Annual events continue during the winter months at area ski resorts such as Boyce Park, Seven Springs, Hidden Valley and Wisp as well as ice skating at PPG Place and North Park.

Rivers
A Formula-1 ChampBoat Series race, the Pittsburgh Three Rivers Regatta, which is the largest inland regatta in the country during July at Point State Park.  There is also an annual large rowing regatta, the Head of the Ohio, which was founded in 1987 and is one of the largest inland regattas in the United States.

Motorsports
The Pittsburgh Vintage Grand Prix, the last remaining vintage automobile race run on city streets in the United States, is held annually at Schenley Park.

Running
For 30 years Pittsburgh has also hosted a large 10K and 5K road race, the Richard S. Caliguiri City of Pittsburgh Great Race, which attracts nearly 10,000 athletes and has been ranked as a Top 20 Multi-Race Events by USA Track & Field's publication On The Roads. In addition, the 28th Pittsburgh Marathon will be hosted in the city in May 2018.

Basketball
Pittsburgh was previously home to the first national high school all-star basketball game, The Dapper Dan Roundball Classic, from 1965 to 1992, prior to its move to Detroit and later Chicago.  It has long been home to the City Game between Pitt and Duquesne.

Cycling
Since 1983 the Dirty Dozen Cycle Race has been held in the city.

Awards banquet
Since 1936 the Dapper Dan Charities, a civic sports organization founded in part by a former editor Pittsburgh Post-Gazette has hosted an annual local and national celebrity and sport star dinner first at the William Penn Hotel then at the Hilton ballrooms and more recently at the David L. Lawrence Convention Center.

Other events

Pittsburgh has its own cricket league conducted by Pittsburgh Cricket Association which was founded in 2005. The league features about 16 teams and the games are held at linbrook park and edgebrook field.
The Pittsburgh Cricket Association, revived in 2004 from the long dormant 1882 Pittsburgh Cricket Club charter, comprises 16 active teams and more than 250 members.

PCA is a 501(c)(3) non-profit corporation organized for charitable purposes to further the sport of cricket in Pittsburgh and surrounding areas. The specific purposes for which this corporation is organized are: To promote, encourage, foster and cultivate interest in the sport of cricket; To initiate, sponsor, promote and carry out plans, policies and activities that would further the development and advancement of cricket in Pittsburgh and North Eastern PA; To develop, foster and train amateur athletes for representation in state, national and international cricket competitions; to promote building of facilities for other non-traditional sports like badminton, table tennis and rugby.

Tennis: Historically the Pittsburgh Triangles of the 1970s played tennis at the Civic Arena, winning the WTT championship in 1975. The arena also hosted the Pittsburgh Open tennis tournament from 1979 until 1984.  The year-round facilities at Mellon Park Tennis Center currently serve the city.
Gaelic football: Teams such as the Celtics (men's) and Banshees (women's), founded in 1976 and 2002, respectively. The Celtics won the Midwest title in 2002, 2006, and won both the midwest and National titles in 2011. The Banshees won the Midwest title in 2004, 2005, and both the midwest and Junior B shield national title in 2011. 
Roller derby: Steel City Derby Demons of the WFTDA. 
Dodgeball: NDL's Pittsburgh Punishers.

People

Multiple professional athletes were born or raised in the Pittsburgh area. Major League Baseball players Ken Griffey Sr., his Hall of Fame son Ken Griffey Jr., and Hall of Famer Stan Musial were born in Donora, Pennsylvania. Hall of Fame inductee, player and manager of the Pittsburgh Pirates, Honus Wagner was born and raised in Chartiers. Major League outfielder Tito Francona and pitcher Doc Medich were born in Aliquippa. Super Bowl winning coaches Bill Cowher and Mike Ditka were born in Pittsburgh and Carnegie respectively. Super Bowl winning quarterback Joe Namath and Heisman Trophy winner Tony Dorsett were born in Beaver Falls and Rochester respectively.  3 Time Super Bowl MVP Joe Montana is from New Eagle. Jim Kelly from East Brady was the leading QB of the Buffalo Bills to 4 straight Super Bowl appearances. Johnny Unitas, National Football League's most valuable player in 1959, 1964 and 1967 is from Pittsburgh as well. Owner of the Dallas Mavericks, Mark Cuban and Basketball Hall of Fame member Jack Twyman were born in Pittsburgh. Olympic gold medalists Swin Cash and Kurt Angle, the latter of whom went on to become a major star in professional wrestling, were born in McKeesport and Pittsburgh respectively. Professional golfers Rocco Mediate and Arnold Palmer were born in Greensburg and Latrobe respectively. Author Jim O'Brien, who was born in Pittsburgh, has authored 20 books about Pittsburgh sports.

Cradle of quarterbacks 
The Pittsburgh region also has developed many notable athletes that have gone on to outstanding careers in professional sports. The region has produced a multitude of NFL quarterbacks, giving Western Pennsylvania the nickname "Cradle of Quarterbacks." Dan Marino, Joe Montana, Joe Namath, Jim Kelly, Johnny Unitas, Bruce Gradkowski, Marc Bulger, George Blanda, Johnny Lujack, Jeff Hostetler, Gus Frerotte, Willie Thrower, Warren Heller, Johnny Gildea, Tyler Palko, Alex Van Pelt, Sandy Stephens, Terry Hanratty, Mike McMahon, Major Harris, Matt Cavanaugh, Chuck Fusina, Rod Rutherford, Ted Marchibroda, Babe Parilli, John Hufnagel, Tom Sherman, Richie Lucas, Boyd Brumbaugh, Scott Zolak, Ed Matesic, Tom Clements, Coley McDonough, Charley Seabright and former Pittsburgh Steelers quarterback Charlie Batch all hail from within a 50-mile radius of the city.

Former professional franchises 

*The championships listed for the teams are the highest possible achievement in their respective leagues for each season. For baseball seasons prior to the advent of the World Series in 1903 and the Negro World Series in 1942, National League Championships and Negro National League Championships are listed.

Professional venues

Pirates
Exposition Park I (1882)
Exposition Park II (1883)
Recreation Park (1884–1890)
Exposition Park III (1891–1909)
Forbes Field (1909–1969)
Three Rivers Stadium (1970–2000)
PNC Park (2001–present)

Steelers
Forbes Field (1933–1963)
Pitt Stadium (1958–1970)
Three Rivers Stadium (1970–2000)
Heinz Field (2001–present)

Penguins
Civic/Mellon Arena (1967–2010)
Consol Energy Center/PPG Paints Arena (2010–present)

Notes

References

Further reading